Left Behind is a 2000 religious thriller film directed by Vic Sarin and starring Kirk Cameron, Brad Johnson, Gordon Currie, and Clarence Gilyard. The film was based on the best-selling 1995 Christian eschatological end-times novel of the same name written by Tim LaHaye and Jerry B. Jenkins, adapted for the screen by Alan B. McElroy. The film was released first direct-to-video, followed by a limited theatrical release.

At the time of its release, the film was promoted by its creators as the "biggest and most ambitious Christian film ever made." The film received generally negative reviews, holding a 16% score on review-aggregation site Rotten Tomatoes. Despite this, the film managed to spawn two additional sequels based on the second novel in the series, Tribulation Force and World at War.

Plot
GNN television journalist Cameron "Buck" Williams (Kirk Cameron) reports from Israel about a new technology which will allow food to grow in inhospitable environments. He interviews Israeli scientist Chaim Rosenzweig (Colin Fox), and praises him for creating a miracle. Suddenly, Arab and Russian fighter jets fly overhead in a surprise air raid. A missile hits near Buck and Chaim as they retreat to a military bunker. The sun disappears even though it is still mid-day. The Israeli military is unable to counterattack, but the attacking jets start spontaneously exploding and crashing down. Buck runs outside with the news camera and records the drama as some GNN executives and reporters watch back in Chicago. The entire attacking force is destroyed.

The story shifts to pilot Rayford Steele (Brad Johnson), who has been asked to fly from New York City to London at short notice, causing him to miss his son Raymie's birthday party. Despite his wife's and his daughter's protests, he agrees and leaves his family behind. Rayford's daughter, Chloe Steele (Janaya Stephens), is leaving for her college exams. Buck, having decided to go to London for an investigation of the attack, boards Rayford's plane.

On the flight, a flight attendant, Hattie Durham (Chelsea Noble), who is having an affair with Rayford, reveals she's taking a job at the UN and this is her last flight. Later during the flight, some passengers awaken to realize that several of their fellow passengers are missing. Panic sets in, and Buck helps Hattie try to keep the passengers calm. Upon returning to the cockpit, they discover that people (later revealed to be Christians) are mysteriously disappearing worldwide and some planes are down from missing flight crews. He is forced to turn the plane back and land in Chicago. Shortly after landing, Buck locates Rayford and asks him to fly him to New York City. Rayford refuses, saying that he has to be with his family, but says he will find Buck a private pilot, and they both drive to Rayford's home.

Meanwhile, Chloe is driving home from her college exams when she encounters a large traffic accident. She goes to check on a crashed semi, whose driver vanished. People are reporting abandoned cars and children missing from their seats. While Chloe is inspecting the carnage, her car is stolen by a hurt man and she is stranded on the wrecked highway. She eventually starts walking down the highway. Rayford discovers that his wife and son are missing. He and Buck are forced to stay in the house because of a military-enforced curfew. Rayford starts to read his wife's Bible.

Chloe returns home, reunites with her father and discovers Buck sleeping on the couch. After conversing about her missing family, Chloe drives Buck to the airport and goes to look for her younger brother.  Buck takes a plane to New York with pilot Ken Ritz. Rayford finds Chloe in an elementary school. He suggests they search the church because that is where his wife and son were most happy. Chloe refuses to go to church, saying that her mother was happiest when Ray was home. After Chloe returns home, Rayford goes to New Hope Village Church and finds Pastor Bruce Barnes (Clarence Gilyard). Bruce has also been left behind because he never truly believed in God. A believer at last, he begs for forgiveness and asks God for a second chance to help people. Rayford enters the church and kneels next to Bruce, telling him that God already has used him. They then watch a videotape left by another Reverend Billings dealing with the Rapture, in which all true believers are taken to Heaven, while the rest are left behind to endure the Tribulation—seven years of war and suffering.

When Buck gets to New York City, he finds that his friend Dirk Burton has been killed. While he is there, he takes a computer disc and is almost shot by a sniper. Buck decodes the computer disc and finds out that someone is trying to bankrupt the UN in order to control the world's food supply. Rayford confronts Hattie, telling her that their "affair" was wrong, and that he wants her forgiveness, and she leaves in a huff. Rayford tells Chloe about God and she says she believes. Meanwhile, Buck flies back to Chicago to meet with an old friend, CIA agent Alan Thompkins, who informs him that the agency is in disarray. After the meeting, Alan is killed in the process of a car bombing, which Buck narrowly escapes. He goes to Rayford's house, because they are the only ones Buck knows in Chicago. Taking the wounded Buck to New Hope Church (as a makeshift hospital), Rayford and Bruce show Buck the tape that Reverend Billings made. Buck, however, does not fully believe the claims, and he goes to warn Chaim about the plot against the UN. Rayford and Chloe attempt to stop him, because he doesn't have God on his side. Buck ignores the Steeles' advice and goes to the UN anyway.

At the UN, Buck sees the plans for a new Jewish temple and realizes that everything Rayford, Chloe and Bruce told him was true. Before the meeting, Buck finally accepts God and asks him to show him the way. God shows him that UN Secretary-General Nicolae Carpathia (Gordon Currie) is the Antichrist when he reveals his plan for world domination, of which his plan to rebuild the temple of Israel is a logical first step. Carpathia shoots Jonathan Stonagal and Joshua Todd-Cothran, the corrupt bankers who were behind the plot to bankrupt the UN, and then brainwashes the new "kings and queens" (the 10 UN delegates) into thinking that Stonagal shot Cothran and himself. Everyone, even the press, believes Carpathia, except Buck, who leaves and returns to the church, where he resolves to fight Carpathia with the help of his friends. Narrating, Buck says the "seven years of peace" declared by Nicolae will be the seven worst years mankind has ever seen, and that faith is all they need.

Cast

 Kirk Cameron as Buck Williams
 Brad Johnson as Captain Rayford Steele
 Gordon Currie as Nicolae Carpathia
 Janaya Stephens as Chloe Steele
 Clarence Gilyard, Jr. as Bruce Barnes
 Chelsea Noble as Hattie Durham
 Colin Fox as Chaim Rosenzweig
 Daniel Pilon as Jonathan Stonagal
 Tony DeSantis as Joshua Todd-Cothran
 Jack Langedijk as Dirk Burton
 Krista Bridges as Ivy Gold
 Thomas Hauff as Steve Plank
 Neil Crone as Ken Ritz
 T.D. Jakes as Pastor Vernon Billings (appearing on a video to be played post-Rapture)
 Rebecca St. James as Buck's assistant
 Bob Carlisle as GNN reporter
 John Hagee as an unnamed passenger on Captain Steele's flight, where many passengers (including Hagee) disappear after the Rapture

Production

Filming
The film cost $17.4 million. Cloud Ten Pictures licensed the rights to the first two Left Behind novels from Namesake Entertainment, which had licensed them from the books' authors. Filming commenced in early May 2000 and continued for a total of 31 days.

An Ontario quarry was used for the scenes of Israel.  Bowmanville Zoo's Mike Hackenberger commented, "Camels sell the look. ... As a prop, camels are great. You can move 'em around, you can stick 'em there, and you see a camel on sand, you know it's desert ... They might not fit through the eye of the needle, but without them, this movie would have been a disaster. There should be at least one camel in every movie."

Casting
Before Janaya Stephens took the role of Chloe Steele, it had been given to Lacey Chabert, who dropped out due to scheduling conflicts.

Some of the extras who played the saved were noted Christian ministers, most notably Jack Van Impe and John Hagee (who are featured on the airplane shortly before the mass disappearance; Hagee was also very instrumental in the film's promotion) and T. D. Jakes (who appears in the video that the group watches, telling them what to expect in the post-Rapture world). Notable Christian musicians were also used as extras; Bob Carlisle and Rebecca St. James appeared as news anchors, and the Christian group Jake appeared as police guards towards the end of the movie.

Soundtrack
Two CDs of music from the film have been released.

On October 3, 2000, Reunion Records released Left Behind: The Movie Soundtrack, featuring a collection of songs from and inspired by the film.
 Left Behind (Main Theme) – Bryan Duncan and SHINEmk
 Never Been Unloved (Bruce's Song) – Michael W. Smith
 I Believe in You – Joy Williams
 Sky Falls Down (Israel Is Attacked) – Third Day
 I Need a Miracle – Plus One
 Hide My Soul – Avalon
 Can´t Wait for You to Return – Fred Hammond
 Midnight Cry (Closing Theme) – Various Artists
 Fly (Chloe's Song) – LaRue
 Believer (Buck's Song) – Jake
 Come Quickly Lord – Rebecca St. James
 After All (Rayford's Song) – Bob Carlisle
 Live for the Lord (Irene's Song) – Kathy Troccoli
 All the Way to Heaven – V*Enna
 No Fear (Panic in the City) – Clay Crosse

On February 6, 2001, Reunion released the second CD, titled Left Behind: The Original Motion Picture Score. The CD featured the orchestral score composed by James Covell, and performed by the London Symphony Orchestra and the Lake Avenue Choir. The CD includes these seventeen tracks:

 Prologue
 Left Behind Main Title
 Surprise Attack
 Rayford's Conversion
 Dirk's in Trouble
 Rebuild the Temple
 Rapture
 Rayford Comes Home
 Loss of a Friend
 Buck's Mission
 Chloe's Choice
 One Left, the Other Taken
 Goodbyes
 I Don't Want to Lose You
 Prayers for Buck
 Seven Years
 The Final Chapter

Release

Home media
3.5 million copies of the film were sold. In a rare tactic, Left Behind was released on DVD first. According to the filmmakers, this was to build interest. The first DVD, released on October 31, 2000, featured coupons for the upcoming theatrical release, allowing those going to see it to get in for the price of a matinee ticket.

The film saw a theatrical release on February 2, 2001.

Box office
The film opened 17th in the nation over the February 2–4 weekend, making $2,158,780. The film went on to gross a total of $4,224,065, barely surpassing its budget.

Critical reception
The film has a 16% rating on Rotten Tomatoes based on 45 reviews with an average rating of 3.2/10 and a critical consensus of "Poor production values, slow pacing, and an implausible story makes Left Behind a movie only for the faithful". The Washington Post Desson Howe described it as "a blundering cringefest, thanks to unintentionally laughable dialogue, hackneyed writing and uninspired direction. The more this movie tries, the worse it gets. Its sincerity ends up becoming a bulging bull's-eye for rotten-tomato throwers."

Legal dispute
Owing to dissatisfaction with the quality of the film and its sequels, LaHaye filed suit against Namesake Entertainment and Cloud Ten Pictures in July 1999, claiming breach of contract. On July 3, 2008, Tim LaHaye and Cloud Ten settled legal disputes on the film adaptations of the book series. Part of the agreement grants LaHaye an opportunity to remake the series. He asserts:

My dream has always been to enter the movie theater with a first-class, high-quality movie that is grippingly interesting, but also is true to the biblical storyline -- and that was diluted in the first attempt. But Lord willing, we are going to see this thing made into the movie that it should be, and that all the world sees it before the real Rapture comes.

As of October 1, 2010, the rights to the Left Behind film series have officially been reclaimed by Cloud Ten Pictures. The series was rebooted with a 2014 film, which has also been poorly received.

References

 All quotes from people affiliated with Left Behind: The Movie are from the "Making of Left Behind" featurette.

Bibliography
 Forbes, Bruce David and Jeanne Halgren Kilde (eds.), Rapture, Revelation, and the End Times: Exploring the Left Behind Series. New York: Palgrave Macmillan, 2004. 
 Frykholm, Amy David. Rapture Culture: Left Behind in Evangelical America. Oxford University Press, 2004.  
 Reed, David A., LEFT BEHIND Answered Verse by Verse. Morrisville, NC: Lulu.com, 2008. 
 Rossing, Barbara R., The Rapture Exposed: The Message of Hope in the Book of Revelation, New York: Basic Books, 2004. 
 Shuck, Glenn W.. Marks Of The Beast: The Left Behind Novels And The Struggle For Evangelical Identity. New York University Press, 2004. 
 Gribben, Crawford, Rapture Fiction and the Evangelical Crisis. Evangelical Press, 2006. .
 Snow Flesher, LeAnn, "Left Behind? The Facts Behind the Fiction". Valley Forge, Judson Press, 2006.

Works cited

External links
 
 
 

Left Behind series
2000 films
2000s English-language films
2000 action films
2000 independent films
Canadian action films
Canadian drama films
English-language Canadian films
Canadian independent films
Apocalyptic films
Films about the rapture
Films about evangelicalism
Films based on American novels
Films directed by Vic Sarin
Films produced by Ralph Winter
Films set in Chicago
Films set in Israel
Films set in New York City
Films shot in Ontario
Cloud Ten Pictures films
Films based on works by Tim LaHaye
Films based on works by Jerry B. Jenkins
2000s Canadian films